The Bethel Threshers football program is a college football team that represents Bethel College in the Kansas Collegiate Athletic Conference, a part of the NAIA.  The team has had 23 head coaches since its first recorded football game in 1914.

Only two coaches have achieved post-season play:  Kent Rogers managed to bring a squad team to post-season play.  Mike Moore took his 2006 team to the 2006 NAIA Football National Championship, losing in the first round to the Missouri Valley Vikings.

Key

Coaches

See also

 List of people from Harvey County, Kansas

Notes

References

Lists of college football head coaches

Kansas sports-related lists